Abiko (written: ,  or ) is a Japanese surname. Notable people with the surname include:

, Japanese-born American businessman
, Japanese sprinter
, Japanese manga artist. His pen name is Fujiko Fujio A.
, Japanese footballer
, Japanese pole vaulter

Japanese-language surnames